Totally Crushed Out! is the second studio album by American alternative rock band That Dog. It was released on July 18, 1995, on DGC Records.

The album produced the single "He's Kissing Christian", for which a music video was directed by Frank Sacramento. Totally Crushed Out! also includes the band's longest song, "Rockstar", clocking in at well over seven minutes.

Background
Totally Crushed Out! is a loosely-based concept album about love and crushes, featuring an album cover that resembles artwork from the Sweet Valley High young adult book series. This theme is further demonstrated within the rest of the album packaging. The tracks are listed as a table of contents with song lyrics broken up into chapters, while photos of the band appear under an "About the Authors" section, with a short biography on each member. The album's back cover features a brief synopsis of a fictitious story that includes the song titles in their playing order within the text:

{{quote|She's feeling like a Ms. Wrong again.  Silently she pursues him even though something doesn't feel right.  Telling herself, "in the back of my mind, I have a crush again."  Either he's kissing Christian or he's being shy.  Anymore of this will put her over the edge.  She wants to say, "to keep me, things are going to have to change because I keep putting on lip gloss and you won't kiss me," but she's too crushed out to talk to him.  It seems like everyone is saying "she doesn't know how to handle another crush."

The holidays are coming and she's getting depressed.  But she knows that babe with the side part will show up one summer night and be her Mr. Right.  It's time for her to say no to the boys who give up like Michael Jordan, so she can find her very own rockstar... or is it?}}

Track listing

Personnel
Credits for Totally Crushed Out!'' adapted from album liner notes.

That Dog
 Anna Waronker – vocals, guitar
 Petra Haden – vocals, violin
 Rachel Haden – vocals, bass, percussion
 Tony Maxwell – drums, piano, acoustic guitar, percussion

Additional musicians
 Tanya Haden – cello
 Joey Waronker – additional percussion
 CRIB – additional noise on "To Keep Me"
 Speculum Fight – additional noise on "To Keep Me"

Production
 That Dog – production, mixing
 Greg Calbi – mastering (Masterdisk)
 Rob Cavallo – production, mixing
 Paul du Gré – production, mixing
 Jerry Finn – mixing
 Tom Grimley – production, mixing

Artwork and design
 That Dog – art direction, design
 Jason Dowd – album cover painting
 Robert Fisher – art direction, design
 Robin Sloane – creative direction

References
Notes

Bibliography

 

That Dog albums
1995 albums
Geffen Records albums
Concept albums